This is the list of episodes of the Japanese anime television series . Created and directed by Yoshiyuki Tomino, Mobile Suit Gundam was produced by Nagoya Broadcasting Network, Sotsu Agency, and Sunrise. The English adaptation of the anime is licensed by Bandai Entertainment.

The series premiered in Japan on Nagoya Broadcasting Network between April 7, 1979 and January 26, 1980, spanning 43 episodes. The English adaptation premiered in the United States on Cartoon Network's Toonami programing block between July 23, 2001 and September 12, 2001. Episode 38 was skipped due to the 9-11, and the show was removed after Episode 39. The final episode did premiere on Toonami's "New Year's Evil" special presentation. Animax Asia also broadcast the English adaptation across Southeast Asia and South Asia. The 15th episode, "Cucuruz Doan's Island" never aired in English.

Two pieces of theme music by Koh Ikeda are used for the episodes, one opening theme and one closing theme.

Staff

Episode list

Footnotes

References

Mobile Suit Gundam
Gundam episode lists